West Germany (Westdeutschland) is the colloquial term used to indicate the Federal Republic of Germany (FRG;  , BRD) between its formation on 23 May 1949 and the German reunification through the accession of East Germany on 3 October 1990. During the Cold War, the western portion of Germany and the associated territory of West Berlin were parts of the Western Bloc. West Germany was formed as a political entity during the Allied occupation of Germany after World War II, established from eleven states formed in the three Allied zones of occupation held by the United States, the United Kingdom, and France. The FRG's provisional capital was the city of Bonn, and the Cold War era country is retrospectively designated as the Bonn Republic (Bonner Republik).

At the onset of the Cold War, Europe was divided between the Western and Eastern blocs. Germany was divided into the two countries. Initially, West Germany claimed an exclusive mandate for all of Germany, representing itself as the sole democratically reorganised continuation of the 1871–1945 German Reich.

Three southwestern states of West Germany merged to form Baden-Württemberg in 1952, and the Saarland joined West Germany as a state in 1957 after it had been separated as the Saar Protectorate from Allied-occupied Germany by France (the separation had been not fully legal as it had been opposed by the Soviet Union). In addition to the resulting ten states, West Berlin was considered an unofficial  eleventh state. While de jure not part of West Germany, as Berlin was under the control of the Allied Control Council (ACC), West Berlin politically aligned itself with West Germany and was directly or indirectly represented in its federal institutions.

The foundation for the influential position held by Germany today was laid during the economic miracle of the 1950s (Wirtschaftswunder), when West Germany rose from the enormous destruction wrought by World War II to become the world's second-largest economy. The first chancellor Konrad Adenauer, who remained in office until 1963, worked for a full alignment with the NATO rather than neutrality, and secured membership in the military alliance. Adenauer was also a proponent of agreements that developed into the present-day European Union. When the G6 was established in 1975, there was no serious debate as to whether West Germany would become a member.

Following the collapse of the Eastern Bloc, symbolised by the opening of the Berlin Wall, both states took action to achieve German reunification. East Germany voted to dissolve and accede to the Federal Republic of Germany in 1990. The five post-war states were reconstituted, along with the reunited Berlin, which ended its special status and formed an additional . They formally joined the federal republic on 3 October 1990, raising the total number of states from ten to sixteen, and ending the division of Germany. The reunited Germany is the direct continuation of the state previously informally called West Germany and not a new state, as the process was essentially a voluntary act of accession: the Federal Republic of Germany was enlarged to include the additional six states of the German Democratic Republic. The expanded Federal Republic retained West Germany's political culture and continued its existing memberships in international organisations, as well as its Western foreign policy alignment and affiliation to Western alliances such as the United Nations, NATO, OECD, and the European Economic Community.

Naming conventions
Reunification was achieved by accession of the German Democratic Republic to the Federal Republic of Germany, so  became the official name of reunified Germany.

This changed under its 1968 constitution, when the idea of a single German nation was abandoned by East Germany. As a result, it officially considered West Germans and West Berliners as foreigners. The initialism BRD (FRG in English) began to prevail in East German usage in the early 1970s, beginning in the newspaper . Other Eastern Bloc nations soon followed suit.

In 1965, the West German Federal Minister of All-German Affairs Erich Mende had issued the "Directives for the Appellation of Germany", recommending avoiding the initialism BRD. On 31 May 1974, the heads of West German federal and state governments recommended always using the full name in official publications. From then on, West German sources avoided the abbreviated form, with the exception of left-leaning organizations which embraced it. In November 1979, the federal government informed the Bundestag that the West German public broadcasters ARD and ZDF had agreed to refuse to use the initialism.

The ISO 3166-1 alpha-2 country code of West Germany was DE (for Deutschland, Germany), which has remained the country code of Germany after reunification. ISO 3166-1 alpha-2 codes are the most widely used country codes, and the DE code is notably used as a country identifier, extending the postal code and as the Internet's country code top-level domain .de. The less widely used ISO 3166-1 alpha-3 country code of West Germany was DEU, which has remained the country code of reunified Germany. The now deleted codes for East Germany, on the other hand, were DD in ISO 3166-1 alpha-2 and DDR in ISO 3166-1 alpha-3.

The colloquial term West Germany or its equivalent was used in many languages.  was also a widespread colloquial form used in German-speaking countries, usually without political overtones.

History

On 4–11 February 1945 leaders from the United States, the United Kingdom, and the Soviet Union held the Yalta Conference where future arrangements regarding post-war Europe and Allied strategy against Japan in the Pacific were negotiated. They agreed that the boundaries of Germany as at 31 December 1937 would be chosen as demarcating German national territory from German-occupied territory; all German annexations after 1937 were automatically null. Subsequently, and into the 1970s, the West German state was to maintain that these 1937 boundaries continued to be 'valid in international law'; although the Allies had already agreed amongst themselves that East Prussia and Silesia must be transferred to Poland and the Soviet Union in any Peace agreement. The conference agreed that post-war Germany, minus these transfers, would be divided into four occupation zones: a French Zone in the far west; a British Zone in the northwest; an American Zone in the south; and a Soviet Zone in the East. Berlin was separately divided into four zones. These divisions were not intended to dismember Germany, only to designate zones of administration.

By the subsequent Potsdam Agreement, the four Allied Powers asserted joint sovereignty over "Germany as a whole", defined as the totality of the territory within the occupation zones. Former German areas east of the rivers Oder and Neisse and outside of 'Germany as a whole' were officially separated from German sovereignty in August 1945 and transferred from Soviet military occupation to Polish and Soviet (in the case of the territory of Kaliningrad) civil administration, their Polish and Soviet status to be confirmed at a final Peace Treaty. Following wartime commitments by the Allies to the governments-in-exile of Czechoslovakia and Poland, the Potsdam Protocols also agreed to the 'orderly and humane' transfer to Germany as a whole of the ethnic German populations in Poland, Czechoslovakia and Hungary. Eight million German expellees and refugees eventually settled in West Germany. Between 1946 and 1949, three of the occupation zones began to merge. First, the British and American zones were combined into the quasi-state of Bizonia. Soon afterwards, the French zone was included into Trizonia. Conversely, the Soviet zone became East Germany. At the same time, new federal states were formed in the Allied zones; replacing the geography of pre-Nazi German states such as the Free State of Prussia and the Republic of Baden, which had derived ultimately from former independent German kingdoms and principalities.

In the dominant post-war narrative of West Germany, the Nazi regime was characterised as having been a 'criminal' state, illegal and illegitimate from the outset; while the Weimar Republic was characterised as having been a 'failed' state, whose inherent institutional and constitutional flaws had been exploited by Hitler in his illegal seizure of dictatorial powers. Consequently, following the death of Hitler in 1945 and the subsequent capitulation of the German Armed Forces, the national political, judicial, administrative, and constitutional instruments of both Nazi Germany and the Weimar Republic were understood as entirely defunct, such that a new West Germany could be established in a condition of constitutional nullity. Nevertheless, the new West Germany asserted its fundamental continuity with the 'overall' German state that was held to have embodied the unified German people since the Frankfurt Parliament of 1848, and which from 1871 had been represented within the German Reich; albeit that this overall state had become effectively dormant long before 8 May 1945.

In 1949 with the continuation and aggravation of the Cold War (for example, the Berlin Airlift of 1948–49), the two German states that were originated in the Western Allied and the Soviet Zones became known internationally as West Germany and East Germany. Commonly known in English as East Germany, the former Soviet occupation zone, eventually became the German Democratic Republic or GDR. In 1990 West Germany and East Germany jointly signed the Treaty on the Final Settlement with Respect to Germany (also known as the "Two-plus-Four Agreement"); by which transitional status of Germany following World War II was definitively ended and the Four Allied powers relinquished their joint residual sovereign authority for Germany as a whole including the area of West Berlin which had officially remained under Allied occupation for the purposes of international and GDR law (a status that the Western countries applied to Berlin as a whole despite the Soviets declaring the end of occupation of East Berlin unilaterally many decades before). The Two-plus-Four Agreement also saw the two parts of Germany confirm their post-war external boundaries as final and irreversible (including the 1945 transfer of former German lands east of the Oder–Neisse line), and the Allied Powers confirmed their consent to German Reunification. From 3 October 1990, after the reformation of the GDR's , the East German states and East Berlin joined the Federal Republic.

NATO membership

With territories and frontiers that coincided largely with the ones of old Middle Ages East Francia and the 19th-century Napoleonic Confederation of the Rhine, the Federal Republic of Germany, founded on 23 May 1949, under the terms of the Bonn–Paris conventions it obtained "the full authority of a sovereign state" on 5 May 1955 (although "full sovereignty" was not obtained until the Two Plus Four Agreement in 1990). The former occupying Western troops remained on the ground, now as part of the North Atlantic Treaty Organization (NATO), which West Germany joined on 9 May 1955, promising to rearm itself soon.

West Germany became a focus of the Cold War with its juxtaposition to East Germany, a member of the subsequently founded Warsaw Pact. The former capital, Berlin, had been divided into four sectors, with the Western Allies joining their sectors to form West Berlin, while the Soviets held East Berlin. West Berlin was completely surrounded by East German territory and had suffered a Soviet blockade in 1948–49, which was overcome by the Berlin airlift.

The outbreak of the Korean War in June 1950 led to U.S. calls to rearm West Germany to help defend Western Europe from the perceived Soviet threat. Germany's partners in the European Coal and Steel Community proposed to establish a European Defence Community (EDC), with an integrated army, navy and air force, composed of the armed forces of its member states. The West German military would be subject to complete EDC control, but the other EDC member states (Belgium, France, Italy, Luxembourg and the Netherlands) would cooperate in the EDC while maintaining independent control of their own armed forces.

Though the EDC treaty was signed (May 1952), it never entered into force. France's Gaullists rejected it on the grounds that it threatened national sovereignty, and when the French National Assembly refused to ratify it (August 1954), the treaty died. The French Gaullists and communists had killed the French government's proposal. Then other means had to be found to allow West German rearmament. In response, at the London and Paris Conferences, the Brussels Treaty was modified to include West Germany, and to form the Western European Union (WEU). The WEU, however, would regulate the size of the armed forces permitted to each of its member states. Also, the German constitution prohibited any military action, except in the case of an external attack against Germany or its allies. Also, Germans could reject military service on grounds of conscience, and serve for civil purposes instead.

The three Western Allies retained occupation powers in Berlin and certain responsibilities for Germany as a whole. Under the new arrangements, the Allies stationed troops within West Germany for NATO defense, pursuant to stationing and status-of-forces agreements. With the exception of 55,000 French troops, Allied forces were under NATO's joint defense command. (France withdrew from the collective military command structure of NATO in 1966.)

Reforms during the 1960s
Konrad Adenauer was 73 years old when he became chancellor in 1949, and for this reason he was initially reckoned as a caretaker. However, he stayed in power for 14 years. The grand old man of German postwar politics had to be dragged—almost literally—out of office in 1963.

In October 1962 the weekly news magazine  published an analysis of the West German military defence. The conclusion was that there were several weaknesses in the system. Chancellor Adenauer proclaimed in the  that the article was tantamount to high treason and that the authors would be prosecuted. The editor/owner of the magazine, Rudolf Augstein spent some time in jail before the public outcry over the breaking of laws on freedom of the press became too loud to be ignored. The FDP members of Adenauer's cabinet resigned from the government, demanding the resignation of Franz Josef Strauss, Defence Minister, who had decidedly overstepped his competence during the crisis. Adenauer was still wounded by his brief run for president, and this episode damaged his reputation even further. He announced that he would step down in the fall of 1963. His successor was to be Ludwig Erhard.

In the early 1960s, the rate of economic growth slowed down significantly. In 1962 growth rate was 4.7% and the following year, 2.0%. After a brief recovery, the growth rate slowed again into a recession, with no growth in 1967.

A new coalition was formed to deal with this problem. Erhard stepped down in 1966 and was succeeded by Kurt Georg Kiesinger. He led a grand coalition between West Germany's two largest parties, the CDU/CSU and the Social Democratic Party (SPD). This was important for the introduction of new emergency acts: the grand coalition gave the ruling parties the two-thirds majority of votes required for their ratification. These controversial acts allowed basic constitutional rights such as freedom of movement to be limited in case of a state of emergency.

During the time leading up to the passing of the laws, there was fierce opposition to them, above all by the Free Democratic Party, the rising West German student movement, a group calling itself  ("Democracy in Crisis") and members of the Campaign against Nuclear Armament. A key event in the development of open democratic debate occurred in 1967, when the Shah of Iran, Mohammad Reza Pahlavi, visited West Berlin. Several thousand demonstrators gathered outside the Opera House where he was to attend a special performance. Supporters of the Shah (later known as ), armed with staves and bricks attacked the protesters while the police stood by and watched. A demonstration in the centre was being forcibly dispersed when a bystander named Benno Ohnesorg was shot in the head and killed by a plainclothes policeman. (It has now been established that the policeman, Kurras, was a paid spy of the East German security forces.) Protest demonstrations continued, and calls for more active opposition by some groups of students were made, which was declared by the press, especially the tabloid  newspaper, as a massive disruption to life in Berlin, in a massive campaign against the protesters. Protests against the US intervention in Vietnam, mingled with anger over the vigour with which demonstrations were repressed led to mounting militance among the students at the universities in Berlin. One of the most prominent campaigners was a young man from East Germany called Rudi Dutschke who also criticised the forms of capitalism that were to be seen in West Berlin. Just before Easter 1968, a young man tried to kill Dutschke as he bicycled to the student union, seriously injuring him. All over West Germany, thousands demonstrated against the Springer newspapers which were seen as the prime cause of the violence against students. Trucks carrying newspapers were set on fire and windows in office buildings broken.

In the wakes of these demonstrations, in which the question of America's role in Vietnam began to play a bigger role, came a desire among the students to find out more about the role of the parent-generation in the Nazi era. The proceedings of the War Crimes Tribunal at Nuremberg had been widely publicised in Germany but until a new generation of teachers, educated with the findings of historical studies, could begin to reveal the truth about the war and the crimes committed in the name of the German people. One courageous attorney, Fritz Bauer patiently gathered evidence on the guards of the  concentration camp and about twenty were put on trial in Frankfurt in 1963. (The term "Holocaust" for the systematic mass-murder of Jews first came into use in 1979, when a 1978 American mini-series with that name was shown on West German television.) The processes set in motion by the Auschwitz trial reverberated decades later.

The calling in question of the actions and policies of government led to a new climate of debate. The issues of emancipation, colonialism, environmentalism and grass roots democracy were discussed at all levels of society. In 1979 the environmental party, the Greens, reached the 5% limit required to obtain parliamentary seats in the Free Hanseatic City of Bremen provincial election. Also of great significance was the steady growth of a feminist movement in which women demonstrated for equal rights. Until 1977, a married woman had to have the permission of her husband if she wanted to take on a job or open a bank account. Further reforms in 1979 to parental rights law gave equal legal rights to the mother and the father, abolishing the legal authority of the father. Parallel to this, a gay movement began to grow in the larger cities, especially in West Berlin, where homosexuality had been widely accepted during the twenties in the Weimar Republic.

Anger over the treatment of demonstrators following the death of Benno Ohnesorg and the attack on Rudi Dutschke, coupled with growing frustration over the lack of success in achieving their aims led to growing militance among students and their supporters. In May 1968, three young people set fire to two department stores in Frankfurt; they were brought to trial and made very clear to the court that they regarded their action as a legitimate act in what they described as the "struggle against imperialism". The student movement began to split into different factions, ranging from the unattached liberals to the Maoists and supporters of direct action in every form—the anarchists. Several groups set as their objective the aim of radicalising the industrial workers and taking an example from activities in Italy of the Red Brigades, many students went to work in the factories, but with little or no success. The most notorious of the underground groups was the Red Army Faction which began by making bank raids to finance their activities and eventually went underground having killed a number of policemen, several bystanders and eventually two prominent West Germans, whom they had taken captive in order to force the release of prisoners sympathetic to their ideas. In the 1990s attacks were still being committed under the name "RAF". The last action took place in 1993 and the group announced it was giving up its activities in 1998. Evidence that the groups had been infiltrated by German Intelligence undercover agents has since emerged, partly through the insistence of the son of one of their prominent victims, the State Counsel Buback.

Willy Brandt

In the 1969 election, the SPD—headed by Willy Brandt—gained enough votes to form a coalition government with the FDP. Although Chancellor for only just over four years, Willy Brandt was one of the most popular politicians in the whole period. Brandt was a gifted speaker and the growth of the Social Democrats from there on was in no small part due to his personality. Brandt began a policy of rapprochement with West Germany's eastern neighbours, a policy opposed by the CDU. The issue of improving relations with Poland, Czechoslovakia and East Germany made for an increasingly aggressive tone in public debates but it was a huge step forward when Willy Brandt and the Foreign Minister, Walther Scheel (FDP) negotiated agreements with all three countries. (Moscow Agreement, August 1970, Warsaw Agreement, December 1970, Four Power Agreement over the status of West Berlin in 1971 and an agreement on relations between West and East Germany, signed in December 1972.) These agreements were the basis for a rapid improvement in the relations between east and west and led, in the long-term to the dismantlement of the Warsaw Treaty and the Soviet Union's control over Eastern Europe. Brandt's contributions to world peace led to his nomination for the Nobel Peace Prize in 1971.

Chancellor of Domestic Reform 
Although Brandt is perhaps best known for his achievements in foreign policy, his government oversaw the implementation of a broad range of social reforms, and was known as a "Kanzler der inneren Reformen" ('Chancellor of domestic reform'). According to the historian David Childs, "Brandt was anxious that his government should be a reforming administration and a number of reforms were embarked upon". Within a few years, the education budget rose from 16 billion to 50 billion DM, while one out of every three DM spent by the new government was devoted to welfare purposes. As noted by the journalist and historian Marion Dönhoff,

"People were seized by a completely new feeling about life. A mania for large scale reforms spread like wildfire, affecting schools, universities, the administration, family legislation. In the autumn of 1970 Jürgen Wischnewski of the SPD declared, 'Every week more than three plans for reform come up for decision in cabinet and in the Assembly.'"

According to Helmut Schmidt, Willy Brandt's domestic reform programme had accomplished more than any previous programme for a comparable period. Levels of social expenditure were increased, with more funds allocated towards housing, transportation, schools, and communication, and substantial federal benefits were provided for farmers. Various measures were introduced to extend health care coverage, while federal aid to sports organisations was increased. A number of liberal social reforms were instituted whilst the welfare state was significantly expanded (with total public spending on social programs nearly doubling between 1969 and 1975), with health, housing, and social welfare legislation bringing about welcome improvements, and by the end of the Brandt Chancellorship West Germany had one of the most advanced systems of welfare in the world.

Social security 
Substantial increases were made in social security benefits such as injury and sickness benefits, pensions, unemployment benefits, housing allowances, basic subsistence aid allowances, and family allowances and living allowances. In the government's first budget, sickness benefits were increased by 9.3%, pensions for war widows by 25%, pensions for the war wounded by 16%, and retirement pensions by 5%. Numerically, pensions rose by 6.4% (1970), 5.5% (1971), 9.5% (1972), 11.4% (1973), and 11.2% (1974). Adjusted for changes in the annual price index, pensions rose in real terms by 3.1% (1970), 0.3% (1971), 3.9% (1972), 4.4% (1973), and 4.2% (1974). Between 1972 and 1974, the purchasing power of pensioners increased by 19%. In 1970, war pensions were increased by 16%. War victim's pensions rose by 5.5% in January 1971, and by 6.3% in January 1972. By 1972, war pensions for orphans and parents had gone up by around 40%, and for widows by around 50%. Between 1970 and 1972, the "Landabgaberente" (land transfer pension) increased by 55%. Between 1969 and 1974, the average real standard rate of income support rose (in 1991 prices) from around 300 DM to around 400 DM. Between 1970 and 1974, unemployment benefits rose from around 300 euros to around 400 euros per month, and unemployment assistance from just under 200 euros per month to just under 400 euros per month. In 2001 prices, the average standard social assistance benefit level rose from around 200 euros per month in 1969 to over 250 euros per month in 1974. During most of Brandt's years as chancellor, the majority of benefits increased as a percentage of average net earnings.

In 1970, seagoing pilots became retrospectively insurable, and gained full social security as members of the Non-Manual Workers Insurance Institute. That same year, a special regulation came into force for District Master Chimney Sweeps, making them fully insurable under the Craftsman's Insurance Scheme. An increase was made in tax-free allowances for children, which enabled 1,000,000 families to claim an allowance for the second child, compared to 300,000 families previously. The Second Modification and Supplementation Law (1970) increased the allowance for the third child from DM 50 to DM 60, raised the income-limit for the second child allowance from DM 7,800 to DM 13,200; subsequently increased to DM 15,000 by the third modification law (December 1971), DM 16,800 by the fourth modification law (November 1973), and to DM 18,360 by the fifth modification law (December 1973). A flexible retirement age after 62 years was introduced (1972) for invalids and disabled persons, and social assistance was extended to those who previously had to be helped by their relatives. From 1971, special subventions were provided to enable young farmers to quit farming "and facilitate their entry into the non-agricultural pension system by means of back payments".

The Third Modification Law (1974) extended individual entitlements to social assistance by means of higher-income limits compatible with receipt of benefits and lowered age limits for certain special benefits. Rehabilitation measures were also extended, child supplements were expressed as percentages of standard amounts and were thus indexed to their changes, and grandparents of recipients were exempted from potential liability to reimburse expenditure of social assistance carrier. The Third Social Welfare Amendment Act (1974) brought considerable improvements for the disabled, those in need of care, and older persons, and a new fund of 100 million marks for disabled children was established. Allowances for retraining and advanced training and for refugees from East Germany were also increased, together with federal grants for sport. In addition, increases were made in the pensions of 2.5 million war victims. Following a sudden increase in the price of oil, a law was passed in December 1973 granting recipients of social assistance and housing allowances a single heating-oil allowance (a procedure repeated in the winter of 1979 during the Schmidt Administration). Improvements and automatic adjustments of maintenance allowances for participants in vocational training measures were also carried out, and increased allowances were provided for training and retraining, together with special allowances for refugees from East Germany.

There was determined, by statutory regulation issued in February 1970, the category of persons most seriously disabled "to whom, with regard to maintenance aid, an increased demand (50% of the appropriate rate) is being conceded, and, within the scope of relief in special living conditions: a higher rate of nursing aid". In 1971, the retirement age for miners was lowered to 50. An April 1972 law providing for "promotion of social aid services" aimed to remedy, through various beneficial measures (particularly in the field of national insurance and working conditions), the staff-shortage suffered by social establishments in their medico-social, educational and other work. A bill to harmonize re-education benefit and another bill relating to severely disabled persons became law in May and September 1972 respectively. In 1972, winter payments for construction workers were introduced.

To assist family planning and marriage and family guidance, the government allocated DM 2 232 000 in 1973 for the payment and for the basic and further training of staff. A special effort was also made in 1973 to organize the recreation of disabled persons, with a holiday guide for the disabled issued with the aid of the Federal Ministry of Family and Youth Affairs and Health in order to help them find suitable holiday accommodation for themselves and their families. From 1972 to 1973, the total amount of individual aids granted by Guarantee Fund for the integration of young immigrants increased from 17 million DM to 26 million DM. Under a law passed in April 1974, the protection hitherto granted to the victims of war or industrial accidents for the purpose of their occupational and social reintegration was extended to all disabled persons, whatever the cause of their handicap, provided that their capacity to work had been reduced by at least 50%.

Health 
In the field of health care, various measures were introduced to improve the quality and availability of health care provision. Free hospital care was introduced for 9 million recipients of social relief, while a contributory medical service for 23 million panel patients was introduced. Pensioners were exempted from paying a 2% health insurance contribution, while improvements in health insurance provision were carried out, as characterised by an expanded sickness insurance scheme, with the inclusion of preventative treatment. The income limit for compulsory sickness insurance was indexed to changes in the wage level (1970) and the right to medical cancer screening for 23.5 million people was introduced. In January 1971, the reduction of sickness allowance in case of hospitalisation was discontinued. That same year, compulsory health insurance was extended to the self-employed. In 1970, the government included nonmedical psychotherapists and psychoanalysts in the national health insurance program.

Pupils, students and children in kindergartens were incorporated into the accident insurance scheme, which benefited 11 million children. Free medical checkups were introduced that same year, while the Farmers' Sickness Insurance Law (1972) introduced compulsory sickness insurance for independent farmers, family workers in agriculture, and pensioners under the farmers' pension scheme, medical benefits for all covered groups, and cash benefits for family workers under compulsory coverage for pension insurance. Participation in employer's health insurance was extended to four million employees. A Development Law of December 1970 made it possible for all employees voluntarily to become members of the statutory sickness insurance. The level of income for compulsory sickness insurance was indexed to 75% of the respective assessment level for pension insurance, while voluntarily insured employees were granted a claim to an allowance towards their sickness insurance from their employer. This law also introduced a new type of sickness insurance benefit, namely facilities for the early diagnosis of disease. Apart from the discretionary service of disease prevention which had existed since 1923, insured persons now had a right in certain circumstances to medical examinations aimed at the early diagnosis of disease. According to one study, this marked a change in the concept of sickness insurance: it now aimed at securing good health.

The Hospital Financing Law (1972) secured the supply of hospitals and reduced the cost of hospital care, "defined the financing of hospital investment as a public responsibility, single states to issue plans for hospital development, and the federal government to bear the cost of hospital investment covered in the plans, rates for hospital care thus based on running costs alone, hospitals to ensure that public subsidies together with insurance fund payments for patients cover total costs". The Benefit Improvement Law (1973) made entitlement to hospital care legally binding (entitlements already enjoyed in practice), abolished time limits for hospital care, introduced entitlement to household assistance under specific conditions, and also introduced entitlement to leave of absence from work and cash benefits in the event of a child's illness. In 1971, to encourage the growth of registered family holiday centres, the Federal Government granted subsidies for the building and appointing of 28 of these centres at a total cost of 8 million DM. Free preliminary investigations were introduced for 2.5 million children up until the age of 4 for the early detection and correction of developmental disorders, and health research was expanded. Federal grants were increased, especially for the Cancer Research Centre in Heidelberg, while a Federal Institute for Sport Science was set up, together with the Institute for Social Medicine and Epidemiology in Berlin. In addition, funding for new rehabilitation facilities was increased.

Pensions 
The Pension Reform Law (1972) guaranteed all retirees a minimum pension regardless of their contributions and institutionalized the norm that the standard pension (of average earners with forty years of contributions) should not fall below 50% of current gross earnings. The 1972 pension reforms improved eligibility conditions and benefits for nearly every subgroup of the West German population. The income replacement rate for employees who made full contributions was raised to 70% of average earnings. The reform also replaced 65 as the mandatory retirement age with a "retirement window" ranging between 63 and 65 for employees who had worked for at least thirty-five years. Employees who qualified as disabled and had worked for at least thirty-five years were extended a more generous retirement window, which ranged between the ages of 60 and 62. Women who had worked for at least fifteen years (ten of which had to be after the age of age 40) and the long-term unemployed were also granted the same retirement window as the disabled. In addition, there were no benefit reductions for employees who had decided to retire earlier than the age of 65. The legislation also changed the way in which pensions were calculated for low-income earners who had been covered for twenty-five or more years. If the pension benefit fell below a specified level, then such workers were allowed to substitute a wage figure of 75% of the average wage during this period, thus creating something like a minimum wage benefit. According to one study, the 1972 pension reform "enhanced" the reduction of poverty in old age.

Voluntary retirement at 63 with no deductions in the level of benefits was introduced, together with the index-linking of war victim's pensions to wage increases. Guaranteed minimum pension benefits for all West Germans were introduced, along with automatic pension increases for war widows (1970). Fixed minimum rates for women in receipt of very low pensions were also introduced, together with equal treatment for war widows. Improvements in pension provision were made for women and the self-employed, a new minimum pension for workers with at least twenty-five years' insurance was introduced, faster pension indexation was implemented, with the annual adjustment of pensions brought forward by six months, and the Seventh Modification Law (1973) linked the indexation of farmers' pensions to the indexation of the general pension insurance scheme.

A new pension for "severely handicapped" persons was introduced in 1972, along with occupational injury annuities and a special pension for long-standing insurant from the age of 63 and a pension due to "limited earning capacity" from the age of 62. In addition, a special pension benefit was introduced for workers aged 60 and above after unemployment. Under the Severely Handicapped Persons Act of April 1974, a seriously disabled person could retire early on an old age pension at the age of 62 years, provided that he "complied with the other provisions of the legislation on pension insurance".

Education 
In education, the Brandt Administration sought to widen educational opportunities for all West Germans. The government presided over an increase in the number of teachers, generous public stipends were introduced for students to cover their living costs, and West German universities were converted from elite schools into mass institutions. The school leaving age was raised to 16, and spending on research and education was increased by nearly 300% between 1970 and 1974. Working through a planning committee set up for the "joint task" of university development, the Federal Government started to make investment costs in 1971. Fees for higher or further education were abolished, while a considerable increase in the number of higher education institutions took place. A much needed school and college construction program was carried out, together with the introduction of postgraduate support for highly qualified graduates, providing them with the opportunity to earn their doctorates or undertake research studies. A law on individual promotion of vocational training came into force in October 1971, which provided for financial grants for attendance at further general or technical teaching establishments from the second year of studies at higher technical schools, academies and higher education establishments, training centres of second degree, or certain courses of television teaching. Grants were also made in certain cases for attendance at training centres located outside the Federal Republic.

The education budget was doubled from 3% to 6%, while an expansion of secondary education took place. The number of university students went up from 100,000 to 650,000, 30,000 more places were created in the schools, and an additional 1,000 million marks was allocated for new school buildings. In addition, the provision of scholarships was expanded, with the 1970 programme providing for, in the words of one observer, "5,000 new scholarships for graduates, and double that number were being awarded three years later". Grants were introduced for pupils from lower income groups to stay on at school, together with grants for those going into any kind of higher or further education. Increases were also made in educational allowances, as well as spending on science. In 1972, the government allocated 2.1 million DM in grants to promote marriage and family education. Under the Approbationsordnung (medical education profession act) of 1970, the subject of psychosomatic medicine and psychotherapy at German universities became a compulsory subject for medical students, and that same year education of clinical and biomedical engineers was introduced. The Brandt Administration also introduced enabling legislation for the introduction of comprehensives, but left it to the Lander "to introduce them at their discretion". While the more left-wing Lander "rapidly began to do so", other Lander found "all sorts of pretexts for delaying the scheme". By the mid-1980s, Berlin had 25 comprehensives while Bavaria only had 1, and in most Lander comprehensives were still viewed as "merely experimental".

Housing 
In the field of housing, various measures were carried out to benefit householders, such as in improving the rights of tenants and increasing rental assistance. According to the Rent Subsidies Act (Wohngeldgesetz) of 1970, "low-income tenants and owners of accommodations are supported with rents and burdens subsidies". The determination of the income of families taken into consideration for housing allowances was simplified, and increased levels of protection and support for low-income tenants and householders were introduced which led to a drop in the number of eviction notices. By 1974, three times as much was paid out in rent subsidies as in 1969, and nearly one and a half million households received rental assistance. Increases were made in public housing subsidies, as characterised by a 36% increase in the social housing budget in 1970 and by the introduction of a programme for the construction of 200,000 public housing units (1971). From 1970 to 1971, an 18.1% increase in building permits for social housing units was made. Other reforms aimed at improving tenants' rights included protection against conversion of rental housing into condominiums, the prohibition of the misappropriation of living space, new regulation of the apartment broker system, and a fee scale for engineers and architects. In addition, the income limits for eligibility for social housing were raised and adapted in order of general income trends.

A loose form of rent regulation was introduced under the name of "Vergleichmieten" ('comparable rents'), together with the provision of "for family-friendly housing" freight or rent subsidies to owners of apartments or houses whose ceiling had been adapted to increased expenses or incomes (1970). In addition, a law for the creation of property for workers was passed, under which a married worker would normally keep up to 95% of his pay, and graded tax remission for married wage-earners applied up to a wage of 48,000 marks, which indicated the economic prosperity of West Germany at that time. The Town Planning Act (1971) encouraged the preservation of historical heritage and helped open up the way to the future of many German cities, while the Urban Renewal Act (1971) helped the states to restore their inner cities and to develop new neighbourhoods. In addition, Guidelines of December 1972 on the usage of federal funds in assisting social housing construction laid down that a certain standard needed to be observed when building homes for severely disabled persons.

The Second Housing Allowance Law of December 1970 simplified the administration of housing allowances and extended entitlements, increased the income limit to 9,600 DM per year plus 2,400 DM for each family member, raised the general deduction on income to determine reckonable income from 15% to 20%, allowance rates listed in tables replacing complicated calculation procedure based on "bearable rent burdens". The Housing Construction Modification Law (1971) increased the income-limit for access to low rent apartments under the social housing programme from 9,000 DM to 12,000 DM per annum plus 3,000 DM (instead of 2,400) for each family member. The law also introduced special subsidies to reduce the debt burden for builders not surpassing the regular income-limit by more than 40%. Under a 1973 law, the limits were increased to 1,000 DM plus 9,000 DM and 4,200 DM for additional family members. The Rent Improvement Law (1971) strengthened the position of tenants. Under this legislation, notice was to be ruled illegal "where appropriate substitute accommodation not available; landlords obliged to specify reasons for notice", whilst the Eviction Protection Law (1971) established tenant protection against rent rises and notice. The notice was only lawful if in the "justified interest of the landlord". Under this law, higher rents were not recognised as "justified interest". The Second Eviction Protection Law (1972) made the tenant protection introduced under the Eviction Protection Law of 1971 permanent. Under this new law, the notice was only lawful where the landlord proved justified personal interest in the apartment. In addition, rent increases were only lawful if not above normal comparable rents in the same area.

Directives on the housing of foreign workers came into force in April 1971. These directives imposed certain requirements for space, hygiene, safety, and amenities in the accommodation offered by employers. That same year, the Federal Government granted a sum of 17 million DM to the Länder for the improvement and modernization of housing built before 21 June 1948. In addition, according to a 1971 regulation of the Board of the Federal Labour Office, "construction of workers' hostels qualified for government financial support under certain conditions". The "German Council for town development", which was set up by virtue of Article 89 of a law to foster urban building, was partly aimed at planning a favourable environment for families (such as the provision of playgrounds). In 1971, the Federal Labour Office made available DM 425 million in the form of loans to provide 157 293 beds in 2 494 hostels. A year later, the Federal Government (Bund), the Lander and the Federal Labour Office promoted the construction of dwellings for migrant workers. They set aside 10 million DM for this purpose, which allowed the financing of 1650 family dwellings that year.

Development measures were begun in 1972 with federal financial aid granted to the Lander for improvement measures relating to towns and villages, and in the 1972 budget, DM 50 million was earmarked, i.e. a third of the total cost of some 300 schemes. A council for urban development was formed in May 1972 with the purpose of promoting future work and measures in the field of urban renovation. In 1973, the government provided assistance of DM 28 million for the modernisation of old dwellings. New rules were introduced regarding improvements in the law relating to rented property, and control of the rise in rents and protection against cancellation of leases also safeguarded the rights of migrant workers in the sphere of housing. A law of July 1973 fixed the fundamental and minimum requirements regarding workers' dwellings, mainly concerning space, ventilation and lighting, protection against damp, heat and noise, power and heating facilities and sanitary installations.

Civil rights and animal protection 
In regards to civil rights, the Brandt Administration introduced a broad range of socially liberal reforms aimed at making West Germany a more open society. Greater legal rights for women were introduced, as exemplified by the standardisation of pensions, divorce laws, regulations governing use of surnames, and the introduction of measures to bring more women into politics. The voting age was lowered from 21 to 18, the age of eligibility for political office was lowered to 21, and the age of majority was lowered to 18 in March 1974. The Third Law for the Liberalization of the Penal Code (1970) liberalised "the right to political demonstration", while equal rights were granted to illegitimate children that same year. A 1971 amendment to a federal civil service reform bill enabled fathers to apply for part-time civil service work. In 1971, corporal punishment was banned in schools, and that same year a new Highway Code was introduced. In 1973, a measure was introduced that facilitated the adoption of young children by reducing the minimum age for adoptive parents from 35 to 25.

A women's policy machinery at the national level was established in 1972 while amnesty was guaranteed in minor offences connected with demonstrations. From 1970 onwards, parents as well as landlords were no longer legally prohibited "to give or rent rooms or flats to unmarried couples or to allow them to stay overnight". In October 1972, the legal aid system was improved with the compensation paid to private lawyers for legal services to the poor increased. The Bausparkassen Act of 1972 placed all Bausparkassen (from January 1974 onwards) under the supervision of the Federal Banking Supervisory Office, and confined Bausparkassen "to the contract saving business and related activities". The Animal Protection Act, passed in 1972, introduced various safeguards for animals such as not permitting the causing of pain, injury, or suffering to an animal without justification, and limiting experiments to the minimum number of animals necessary. In 1971, rules were introduced making it possible for former guestworkers "to receive an unlimited residence permit after a five-year stay".

Armed forces 

A number of reforms were also carried out to the armed forces, as characterised by a reduction in basic military training from 18 to 15 months, a reorganisation of education and training, and personnel and procurement procedures. Education for the troops was improved, a personnel reshuffle of top management in the Bundeswehr was carried out, academic education was mandated for officers beyond their basic military training, and a new recruiting policy for Bundeswehr personnel was introduced with the intention of building an army that reflected West Germany's pluralistic society. Defense Minister Helmut Schmidt led the development of the first Joint Service Regulation ZDv 10/1 (Assistance for Innere Fuehrung, classified: restricted), which revitalized the concept of Innere Fuehrung while also affirming the value of the "citizen in uniform". According to one study, as a result of this reform, "a strong civil mindset displaced the formerly dominant military mindset", and forced the Bundeswehr's elder generation to accept a new type of soldier envisioned by Schmidt. In addition, the Federal Cost of Moving Act increased the relocation allowance (with effect from 1 November 1973), with the basic allowances raised by DM 50 and DM 100 respectively, while extra allowances for families were raised to a uniform amount of 125 DM.

In 1970, the Armed Forces Vocational Schools and the Vocational Advancement Organization extended their services for the first time to conscripts, "so far as military duty permitted". New enlistment bonuses were authorized and previous bonus schemes were improved, and new pay regulations were introduced that improved the financial situation of military personnel and civil servants. In July 1973, the 3rd Amendment to the Civilian Service Act came into force; "a prerequisite for the creation of additional civilian service places for recognized conscientious objectors". The amendment provided that men recognized as conscientious objectors while performing military service should immediately be transferred to a civilian service assignment. The maximum amount for servicemen enlisting for at least 12 years was increased from DM 6,000 to DM 9,000, and from October 1971 onwards, long-term personnel were paid grants towards the cost 'of attending educational institutes of the "second educational route" or participating in state-recognized general education courses provided by private correspondence schools and the "television college"'. In 1972, two Bundeswehr universities were established; a reform which, according to one historian, "fought against the closed nature of the military and guaranteed that officers would be better able to successfully interact with the civilian world". From April 1973, the general maintenance payments under the Law amending the Maintenance Security Act and the Workplace Protection Act were increased, while increases were also made in the special allowance (Christmas bonus) for conscripts, together with the dismissal allowance. The expense allowance for troops on duty-related absence from place of employment was improved, together with travel subsidies and provisions for military service damaged soldiers and their families. In addition, the position of non-commissioned officers was improved.

Safety and crime 
Legislation aimed at safeguarding consumers was also implemented under the Brandt Administration. The consumer's right of withdrawal in case of hire purchase was strengthened in March 1974, and fixed prices for branded products were abolished by law in January that same year, which meant that manufacturers' recommended prices were not binding for retailers. In addition, a progressive anticartel law was passed. A 1969 law on explosive materials was supplemented by two orders; the first (made in November 1969) establishing a committee of experts for explosive materials, while the second order (made the following month) included details for the implementation of the law on explosive materials. An Act of December 1959 on the peaceful use of nuclear energy and protection against its dangers was amended by an Act of June 1970 that established a tax levied for the costs for permissions and surveillance measures. The Law on Compensation for Measures of Criminal Prosecution and Penalties, passed in March 1971, provided for standardized compensation in certain situations. In addition, the budget for communications was increased. The federal crime-fighting apparatus was also modernised, while a Foreign Tax Act was passed which limited the possibility of tax evasion. 

A law on explosives (Sprengstoffgesetz) was the subject of two application ordinances (on 17 November 1970 and 24 August 1971) and a general regulatory provision (19 May 1971), which covered respectively the application of the law to nationals of EC Member States, the duty of employers to notify in time the inspection authorities of detonation plans, the interpretation of the purpose and field of application of the law, authorizations for transport of explosives, and control and recognition of training courses on work with explosives. Taking into account the enormous high peaks of air traffic noise and its concentration at a limited number of airports, the Law for Protection against Aircraft Noise of 1971 sought to balance two conflicting demands, the first being the legitimate demand by industry, business and the public for an efficient air-traffic-system, and secondly, the understandable and by no means less legitimate claims of the affected people for protection and compensation. The legislation regulated the establishment of so-called "Lärmschutzzonen" (protection areas against aircraft noise) for all 11 international airports and for those 34 military airports used for jet air craft, and the law also authorised the Federal Department of the Interior to decree protection areas for each of those mentioned airports with approval by the "Bundesrat", the representation of the German Federal States.

Workers' rights 

In terms of working conditions, a number of reforms were introduced aimed at strengthening the rights of workers both at home and in the workplace. The Sickness Act of 1970 provided equal treatment of workers and employees in the event of incapacity for work, while maternity leave was increased. Legislation was introduced in 1970 which ensured continued payment of wages for workers disabled by illness. In 1970 all employees unit for work (with the exception of women in receipt of maternity benefits and temporarily and inconsiderably employed persons) were provided with an unconditional legal claim against their employer to continued payment of their gross wage for a period of 6 weeks, as also in the case of spa treatment approved by an Insurance Fund, the Fund bearing the full cost thereof. Previously, payment of employer's supplement and sick pay were only made from the day on which the doctor certified unfitness for work. In 1972, an Act on Agency Work was passed which sought to prevent works agencies from providing job placement services and aimed to provide job minimum protection for employees in agency work. A law on the hiring out of manpower, passed in October 1972, contained provisions to stipulate prior authorization for the hiring out of manpower, to draw a distinction between the system governing workers hired out and the placing of workers, to regulate and improve the rights of hired out workers pertaining to working conditions and social insurance, and provide for more severe penalties and fines to be imposed on offenders.

Improvements were also made in income and work conditions for home workers, accident insurance was extended to non-working adults, and the Border Zone Assistance Act (1971) increased levels of assistance to the declining zonal peripheral area. The Occupational Safety Act (1973) required employers to provide company doctors and safety experts. A directive on protection against noise at the place of work was adopted in November 1970. If measurements showed or there was reason to assume that a noise level guide value of 90 dB( A) may be exceeded at the place of work, then the authority had to instruct the employer to arrange check-ups of the employees concerned and these employees had to use personal noise protection devices. A matching fund program for 15 million employees was also introduced, which stimulated them to accumulate capital.

A ministerial order of January 1970 extended protection in cases of partial unemployment to home workers, while an ordinance of August 1970 fixed the conditions of health necessary for service in the merchant navy. A general provision of October 1970 determined in detail the circumstances in which the competent authority must take action on the basis of the act on the technical means of work. The requirement also stipulated the extent to which the technical standards established by national and international organisations can be regarded as "rules of the art". In a directive of 10 November 1970, the Minister of Labour and Social Affairs recommended to the higher authorities for work protection of the "Lander" to bring in the directive published, in agreement with the Ministry of Labour, by the German Engineers' Association on the evaluation of work station noise in relation to loss of hearing, in order to improve safeguards for workers against the noises in question. In September 1971, an ordinance was published concerning dangerous working materials; safeguarding persons using these materials against the dangers involved. In August 1971, a law came into force directed at reducing atmospheric pollution from lead compounds in four-stroke engine fuels. As a safeguard against radiation, a decree on the system of authorisations for medicaments treated with ionizing radiation or containing radioactive substances, in its version of 8 August 1967, was remodelled by a new Decree of 10 May 1971 which added some radionuclides to the list of medicaments which doctors in private practice were authorized to use.

By a decree of the Federal Minister for Labour and Social Order, the Federal Institute for Industrial Protection became the Federal Agency for Industrial Protection and Accident Research. Amongst its designated tasks included the promotion of industrial protection, accident prevention on the journey to and from work and accident prevention in the home and leisure activities, the encouragement of training and advanced training in the area of industrial protection, and to promote and coordinate accident research. A regulation was issued in 1972 which permitted for the first time the employment of women as drivers of trams, omnibuses and lorries, while further regulations laid down new provisions for lifts and work with compressed air. The Factory Constitution Law (1971) strengthened the rights of individual employees "to be informed and to be heard on matters concerning their place of work". The Works Council was provided with greater authority while trade unions were given the right of entry into the factory "provided they informed the employer of their intention to do so", while a law was passed to encourage wider share ownership by workers and other rank-and-file employees. The Industrial Relations Law (1972) and the Personnel Representation Act (1974) broadened the rights of employees in matters which immediately affected their places of work, while also improving the possibilities for codetermination on operations committees, together with access of trade unions to companies.

The Works Constitution Act of 1972 required in cases of collective dismissal at an establishment normally employing more than twenty employees that management and the works council must negotiate a social plan that stipulates compensation for workers who lose their jobs. In cases where the two parties could not agree on a social plan, the law provided for binding arbitration. In 1972, the rights of works councils to information from management were not only strengthened, but works councils were also provided with full codetermination rights on issues such as working time arrangements in the plant, the setting of piece rates, plant wage systems, the establishment of vacation times, work breaks, overtime, and short-time work. Legislation was passed which acknowledged for the first time the presence of trade unions in the workplace, expanded the means of action of the works councils, and improved their work basics as well as those of the youth councils.

A law of January 1972 on the organization of labour in enterprises significantly extended the works council's right of cooperation and co-management in the matter of vocational training. That same year, the Safety Institute of the Federal Republic of Germany was transformed into a public Federal Agency (Bundesanstalt) with significantly enlarged powers, in the context of which special emphasis would be placed on its new task of promoting and coordinating research in the area of accident prevention. New provisions were introduced for the rehabilitation of severely disabled people ("Schwerbehinderte") and accident victims. The Severely Disabled Persons Act of April 1974 obliged all employers with more than fifteen employees to ensure that 6% of their workforce consisted of people officially recognised as being severely disabled. Employers who failed to do so were assessed 100 DM per month for every job falling before the required quota. These compensatory payments were used to "subsidise the adaptation of workplaces to the requirements of those who were severely handicapped".

A law passed in January 1974, designed to protect members of the supervisory boards of companies who are undergoing training, was aimed at ensuring that the representatives of young workers and youthful members of works councils still undergoing training could perform their duties with greater independence and without fear of disadvantageous consequences for their future careers. On request, workers' representatives on completion of their training courses had to have an employment relationship of unlimited duration. In the field of transport, the Municipal Transportation Finance Law of 1971 established federal guidelines for subsidies to municipal governments, while the Federal Transport Plan of 1973 provided a framework for all transport, including public transport. In addition, the Severely Handicapped Persons Act of April 1974 extended the welfare and promotional obligations of the employer, and provided a right to extra holiday consisting of six working days.

Environmental protection 
A federal environmental programme was established in 1971, and in 1972 laws were passed to regulate garbage elimination and air pollution via emission. Matching grants covering 90% of infrastructure development were allocated to local communities, which led to a dramatic increase in the number of public swimming pools and other facilities of consumptive infrastructure throughout West Germany. In addition, efforts were made to improve the railways and motorways. In 1971, a law was passed setting the maximum lead content at 0.4 grams per liter of gasoline, and in 1972 DDT was banned. The Federal Immissions Control Law, passed in March 1974, provided protection from noxious gases, noise, and air-borne particulate matter.

Economy 
Under the Brandt Administration, West Germany attained a lower rate of inflation than in other industrialised countries at that time, while a rise in the standard of living took place, helped by the floating and revaluation of the mark. This was characterised by the real incomes of employees increasing more sharply than incomes from entrepreneurial work, with the proportion of employees' incomes in the overall national income rising from 65% to 70% between 1969 and 1973, while the proportion of income from entrepreneurial work and property fell over that same period from just under 35% to 30%. In addition, the percentage of West Germans living in poverty (based on various definitions) fell between 1969 and 1973. According to one estimate, the percentage of West Germans living in poverty fell from 9.7% to 8.9% between 1969 and 1973, and from 20.2% to 14.0% according to another estimate. According to another estimate, the percentage of West Germans living in poverty during this period fell from 2.7% to 1.4%.

Helmut Schmidt
Finance Minister Helmut Schmidt (SPD) formed a coalition and he served as Chancellor from 1974 to 1982. Hans-Dietrich Genscher, a leading FDP official, became Vice Chancellor and Foreign Minister. Schmidt, a strong supporter of the European Community (EC) and the Atlantic alliance, emphasized his commitment to "the political unification of Europe in partnership with the USA". Mounting external problems forced Schmidt to concentrate on foreign policy and limited the domestic reforms that he could carry out. The USSR upgraded its intermediate-range missiles, which Schmidt complained was an unacceptable threat to the balance of nuclear power, because it increased the likelihood of political coercion and required a western response. NATO respond in the form of its twin-track policy. The domestic reverberations were serious inside the SPD, and undermined its coalition with the FDP. One of his major successes, in collaboration with French President Valéry Giscard d'Estaing, was the launching of the European Monetary System (EMS) in April 1978.

Helmut Kohl
In October 1982 the SPD–FDP coalition fell apart when the FDP joined forces with the CDU/CSU to elect CDU Chairman Helmut Kohl as Chancellor in a constructive vote of no confidence. Following national elections in March 1983, Kohl emerged in firm control of both the government and the CDU. The CDU/CSU fell just short of an absolute majority, due to the entry into the Bundestag of the Greens, who received 5.6% of the vote.

In January 1987 the Kohl–Genscher government was returned to office, but the FDP and the Greens gained at the expense of the larger parties. Kohl's CDU and its Bavarian sister party, the CSU, slipped from 48.8% of the vote in 1983 to 44.3%. The SPD fell to 37%; long-time SPD Chairman Brandt subsequently resigned in April 1987 and was succeeded by Hans-Jochen Vogel. The FDP's share rose from 7% to 9.1%, its best showing since 1980. The Greens' share rose to 8.3% from their 1983 share of 5.6%.

Reunification

With the collapse of eastern bloc in 1989, symbolised by the opening of the Berlin Wall, there was a rapid move towards German reunification; and a final settlement of the post-war special status of Germany. Following democratic elections, East Germany declared its accession to the Federal Republic subject to the terms of the Unification Treaty between the two states; and then both West Germany and East Germany radically amended their respective constitutions in accordance with that Treaty's provisions. East Germany then dissolved itself, and its five post-war states were reconstituted, along with the reunited Berlin which ended its special status and formed an additional . They formally joined the Federal Republic on 3 October 1990, raising the number of states from 10 to 16, ending the division of Germany. The expanded Federal Republic retained West Germany's political culture and continued its existing memberships in international organisations, as well as its Western foreign policy alignment and affiliation to Western alliances like NATO and the European Union.

The official German reunification ceremony on 3 October 1990 was held at the  building, including Chancellor Helmut Kohl, President Richard von Weizsäcker, former Chancellor Willy Brandt and many others. One day later, the parliament of the united Germany would assemble in an act of symbolism in the Reichstag building.

However, at that time, the role of Berlin had not yet been decided upon. Only after a fierce debate, considered by many as one of the most memorable sessions of parliament, the  concluded on 20 June 1991, with quite a slim majority, that both government and parliament should move to Berlin from Bonn.

Economic miracle
The West German  ("economic miracle", coined by The Times) began in 1950. The Allied dismantling of the West German coal and steel industry finally ended in 1950.

As demand for consumer goods increased after World War II, the resulting shortage helped overcome lingering resistance to the purchase of German products. At the time Germany had a large pool of skilled and cheap labour, partly as a result of the flight and expulsion of Germans from Central and Eastern Europe, which affected up to 16.5 million Germans. This helped Germany to more than double the value of its exports during the war. This would have implications later on for successive German governments as they tried to assimilate this group of workers.

With the dropping of Allied reparations, the freeing of German intellectual property and the impact of the Marshall Plan stimulus, West Germany developed one of the strongest economies in the world, almost as strong as before the Second World War. The East German economy showed a certain growth, but not as much as in West Germany, partly because of continued reparations to the USSR.

In 1952, West Germany became part of the European Coal and Steel Community, which would later evolve into the European Union. On 5 May 1955 West Germany was declared to have the "authority of a sovereign state". The British, French and U.S. militaries remained in the country, just as the Soviet Army remained in East Germany. Four days after obtaining the "authority of a sovereign state" in 1955, West Germany joined NATO. The UK and the USA retained an especially strong presence in West Germany, acting as a deterrent in case of a Soviet invasion. In 1976 West Germany became one of the founding nations of the Group of Six (G6). In 1973, West Germany—home to roughly 1.26% of the world's population—featured the world's fourth largest GDP of 944 billion (5.9% of the world total). In 1987 the FRG held a 7.4% share of total world production.

Demographics

Population and vital statistics

Religion

Religious affiliation in West Germany decreased from the 1960s onward. Religious affiliation declined faster among Protestants than among Catholics, causing the Roman Catholic Church to overtake the EKD as the largest denomination in the country during the 1970s.

Position towards East Germany

The official position of West Germany concerning East Germany at the outset was that the West German government was the only democratically elected, and therefore the only legitimate, representative of the German people. According to the Hallstein Doctrine, any country (with the exception of the USSR) that recognised the authorities of the German Democratic Republic would not have diplomatic relations with West Germany.

In the early 1970s, Willy Brandt's policy of "" led to a form of mutual recognition between East and West Germany. The Treaty of Moscow (August 1970), the Treaty of Warsaw (December 1970), the Four Power Agreement on Berlin (September 1971), the Transit Agreement (May 1972), and the Basic Treaty (December 1972) helped to normalise relations between East and West Germany and led to both German states joining the United Nations. The Hallstein Doctrine was relinquished, and West Germany ceased to claim an exclusive mandate for Germany as a whole.

Following the Ostpolitik the West German view was that East Germany was a de facto government within a single German nation and a de jure state organisation of parts of Germany outside the Federal Republic. The Federal Republic continued to maintain that it could not within its own structures recognise the GDR de jure as a sovereign state under international law; while at the same time acknowledging that, within the structures of international law, the GDR was an independent sovereign state. By distinction, West Germany then viewed itself as being within its own boundaries, not only the de facto and de jure government, but also the sole de jure legitimate representative of a dormant "Germany as whole". The two Germanies relinquished any claim to represent the other internationally; which they acknowledged as necessarily implying a mutual recognition of each other as both capable of representing their own populations de jure in participating in international bodies and agreements, such as the United Nations and the Helsinki Final Act.

This assessment of the Basic Treaty was confirmed in a decision of the Federal Constitutional Court in 1973;
 "... the German Democratic Republic is in the international-law sense a State and as such a subject of international law. This finding is independent of recognition in international law of the German Democratic Republic by the Federal Republic of Germany. Such recognition has not only never been formally pronounced by the Federal Republic of Germany but on the contrary repeatedly explicitly rejected. If the conduct of the Federal Republic of Germany towards the German Democratic Republic is assessed in the light of its détente policy, in particular the conclusion of the Treaty as de facto recognition, then it can only be understood as de facto recognition of a special kind. The special feature of this Treaty is that while it is a bilateral Treaty between two States, to which the rules of international law apply and which like any other international treaty possesses validity, it is between two States that are parts of a still existing, albeit incapable of action as not being reorganized, comprehensive State of the Whole of Germany with a single body politic."

The West German Constitution ("Basic Law") provided two articles for the unification with other parts of Germany:

 Article 23 provided the possibility for other parts of Germany to join the Federal Republic (under the constitution of the Federal Republic of Germany).
 Article 146 provided the possibility for unification of all parts of Germany under a new constitution.

After the peaceful revolution of 1989 in East Germany, the Volkskammer of the GDR on 23 August 1990 declared the accession of East Germany to the Federal Republic under Article 23 of the Basic Law; and so initiated the process of reunification, to come into effect on 3 October 1990. Nevertheless, the act of reunification itself (with its many specific terms and conditions; including fundamental amendments to the West German Basic Law) was achieved constitutionally by the subsequent Unification Treaty of 31 August 1990; that is through a binding agreement between the former GDR and the Federal Republic now recognising each another as separate sovereign states in international law. Amongst these amendments was the repeal of the very Article 23 in respect of which the GDR had nominally declared its postdated accession to the Federal Republic.

The two German states entered into a currency and customs union in July 1990, and on 3 October 1990, the German Democratic Republic dissolved and the re-established five East German  (as well as a unified Berlin) joined the Federal Republic of Germany, bringing an end to the East–West divide.

Politics
Political life in West Germany was remarkably stable and orderly. The Adenauer era (1949–63) was followed by a brief period under Ludwig Erhard (1963–66) who, in turn, was replaced by Kurt Georg Kiesinger (1966–69). All governments between 1949 and 1966 were formed by the united caucus of the Christian-Democratic Union (CDU) and Christian Social Union (CSU), either alone or in coalition with the smaller Free Democratic Party (FDP) or other right-wing parties.

Kiesinger's 1966–69 "Grand Coalition" was between West Germany's two largest parties, the CDU/CSU and the Social Democratic Party (SPD). This was important for the introduction of new emergency acts—the Grand Coalition gave the ruling parties the two-thirds majority of votes required to see them in. These controversial acts allowed basic constitutional rights such as freedom of movement to be limited in case of a state of emergency.

Leading up to the passing of the laws, there was fierce opposition to them, above all by the FDP, the rising German student movement, a group calling itself  ("Democracy in a State of Emergency") and the labour unions. Demonstrations and protests grew in number, and in 1967 the student Benno Ohnesorg was shot in the head by a policeman. The press, especially the tabloid  newspaper, launched a campaign against the protesters.

By 1968 a stronger desire to confront the Nazi past had come into being. In the 1970s environmentalism and anti-nationalism became fundamental values among left-wing Germans. As a result, in 1979 the Greens were able to reach the 5% minimum required to obtain parliamentary seats in the Free Hanseatic City of Bremen state election, and with the foundation of the national party in 1980 developed into one of the most politically successful green movements in the world.

Another result of the unrest in the 1960s was the founding of the Red Army Faction (RAF). The RAF was active from 1968, carrying out a succession of terrorist attacks in West Germany during the 1970s. Even in the 1990s, attacks were still being committed under the name RAF. The last action took place in 1993, and in 1998 the group announced it was ceasing activities.

In the 1969 election, the SPD gained enough votes to form a coalition government with the FDP. However the affair is widely considered to have been merely a trigger for Brandt's resignation, not a fundamental cause. Instead, Brandt, dogged by scandal relating to alcohol and depression as well as the economic fallout of the 1973 oil crisis, almost seems simply to have had enough. As Brandt himself later said, "I was exhausted, for reasons which had nothing to do with the process going on at the time".

Finance Minister Helmut Schmidt (SPD) then formed a government, continuing the SPD–FDP coalition. He served as Chancellor from 1974 to 1982. Hans-Dietrich Genscher, a leading FDP official, was Vice Chancellor and Foreign Minister in the same years. Schmidt, a strong supporter of the European Community (EC) and the Atlantic alliance, emphasized his commitment to "the political unification of Europe in partnership with the USA".

The goals of SPD and FDP however drifted apart in the late 1970s and early 1980s. On 1 October 1982 the FDP joined forces with the CDU/CSU to elect CDU Chairman Helmut Kohl as Chancellor in a constructive vote of no confidence. Following national elections in March 1983, Kohl emerged in firm control of both the government and the CDU. The CDU/CSU fell just short of an absolute majority, because of the entry into the Bundestag of the Greens, who received 5.6% of the vote.

In January 1987 the Kohl–Genscher government was returned to office, but the FDP and the Greens gained at the expense of the larger parties. The Social Democrats concluded that not only were the Greens unlikely to form a coalition, but also that such a coalition would be far from a majority. Neither condition changed until 1998.

Denazification

In 1951 several laws were passed, ending the denazification. As a result, many people with a former Nazi past ended up again in the political apparatus of West Germany. West German President Walter Scheel and Chancellor Kurt Georg Kiesinger were both former members of the Nazi Party. In 1957, 77% of the West German Ministry of Justice's senior officials were former Nazi Party members. Konrad Adenauer's State Secretary Hans Globke had played a major role in drafting anti-semitic Nuremberg Race Laws in Nazi Germany.

Culture
In many aspects, German culture continued in spite of the dictatorship and wartime. Old and new forms coexisted next to each other, and the American influence, already strong in the 1920s, grew.

Sport

In the 20th century, association football became the largest sport in Germany. The Germany national football team, established in 1900, continued its tradition based in the Federal Republic of Germany, winning the 1954 FIFA World Cup in a stunning upset dubbed the miracle of Bern. Earlier, the German team was not considered part of the international top. The 1974 FIFA World Cup was held in West German cities and West Berlin. After having been beaten by their East German counterparts in the first round, the team of the German Football Association won the cup again, defeating the Netherlands 2–1 in the final. With the process of unification in full swing in the summer of 1990, the Germans won a third World Cup, with players that had been capped for East Germany not yet permitted to contribute. European championships have been won too, in 1972, 1980 and 1996.

After both Olympic Games of 1936 had been held in Germany, Munich was selected to host the 1972 Summer Olympics. These were also the first summer games in which the East Germans showed up with the separate flag and anthem of the GDR. Since the 1950s, Germany at the Olympics had been represented by a united team led by the pre-war German NOC officials as the IOC had denied East German demands for a separate team.

The 800-page "Doping in Germany from 1950 to today" study details how the West German government helped fund a wide-scale doping programme. West Germany encouraged and covered up a culture of doping across many sports for decades.

As in 1957, when the Saarland acceded, East German sport organisations ceased to exist in late 1990 as their subdivisions and their members joined their Western counterparts. Thus, the present German organisations and teams in football, Olympics and elsewhere are identical to those that had been informally called "West German" before 1991. The only differences were a larger membership and a different name used by some foreigners. These organisations and teams in turn mostly continued the traditions of those that represented Germany before the Second World War, and even the First World War, thus providing a century-old continuity despite political changes. On the other hand, the separate East German teams and organisations were founded in the 1950s; they were an episode lasting less than four decades, yet quite successful in that time.

West Germany played 43 matches at the European Championships, more than any other national team.

Literary scene
Besides the interest in the older generation of writers, new authors emerged on the background of the experiences of war and after war period. Heinrich Böll is considered an observer of the young Federal Republic from the 1950s to the 1970s, and caused some political controversies because of his increasingly critical view on society. The Frankfurt Book Fair (and its Peace Prize of the German Book Trade) soon developed into a regarded institution. Exemplary for West Germany's literature are – among others – Siegfried Lenz (with The German Lesson) and Günter Grass (with The Tin Drum and The Flounder).

Geographical distribution of government

In West Germany, most of the political agencies and buildings were located in Bonn, while the German Stock Market was located in Frankfurt which became the economic center. The judicial branch of both the German Federal Constitutional Court and the highest Court of Appeals, were located in Karlsruhe.

The West German government was known to be much more decentralised than its state socialist East German counterpart, the former being a federal state and the latter a unitary one.

Present geographical and political terminology
Today, North Rhine-Westphalia is often considered to be Western Germany in geographical terms.

See also

 Economic history of the German reunification
 Petersberg Agreement

Notes

Footnotes

References

Sources

Further reading

 Bark, Dennis L., and David R. Gress. A History of West Germany Vol 1: From Shadow to Substance, 1945–1963 (1992); ; vol 2: Democracy and Its Discontents 1963–1988 (1992) 
 Berghahn, Volker Rolf. Modern Germany: society, economy, and politics in the twentieth century (1987) ACLS E-book online
 Hanrieder, Wolfram F. Germany, America, Europe: Forty Years of German Foreign Policy (1989) 
 Henderson, David R. "German Economic Miracle." The Concise Encyclopedia of Economics (2008).
 Jarausch, Konrad H. After Hitler: Recivilizing Germans, 1945–1995 (2008)
 Junker, Detlef, ed. The United States and Germany in the Era of the Cold War (2 vol 2004), 150 short essays by scholars covering 1945–1990
 MacGregor, Douglas A. The Soviet-East German Military Alliance, New York, Cambridge University Press, 1989.
 Main, Steven J. "The Soviet Occupation of Germany. Hunger, Mass Violence and the Struggle for Peace, 1945–1947." Europe-Asia Studies (2014) 66#8 pp. 1380–1382.
 Maxwell, John Allen. "Social Democracy in a Divided Germany: Kurt Schumacher and the German Question, 1945–52." PhD dissertation, West Virginia University, 1969.
 Merkl, Peter H. ed. The Federal Republic of Germany at Fifty (1999)
 Mierzejewski, Alfred C. Ludwig Erhard: A Biography (2004) online
 Pruys, Karl Hugo . Kohl: Genius of the Present : A Biography of Helmut Kohl (1996)
 Schwarz, Hans-Peter. Konrad Adenauer: A German Politician and Statesman in a Period of War, Revolution and Reconstruction (2 vol 1995) excerpt and text search vol 2; also full text vol 1; and full text vol 2
 Smith, Gordon, ed, Developments in German Politics (1992) , broad survey of reunified nation
 Smith, Helmut Walser, ed. The Oxford Handbook of Modern German History (2011) pp. 593–753.
 Weber, Jurgen. Germany, 1945–1990 (Central European University Press, 2004) online edition
 Williams, Charles. Adenauer: The Father of the New Germany (2000) Online

Primary sources
 Beate Ruhm Von Oppen, ed. Documents on Germany under Occupation, 1945–1954 (Oxford University Press, 1955) online

External links

 
Contemporary German history
Anti-communism in Germany
Borders of Germany
Political history of Germany
States and territories established in 1949